The 17th Washington D.C. Area Film Critics Association Awards were announced on December 3, 2018.

Winners and nominees

Best Film
 Roma
 The Favourite
 Green Book
 If Beale Street Could Talk
 A Star Is Born

Best Director
 Alfonso Cuarón – Roma
 Ryan Coogler – Black Panther
 Bradley Cooper – A Star Is Born
 Barry Jenkins – If Beale Street Could Talk
 Yorgos Lanthimos – The Favourite

Best Actor
 Bradley Cooper – A Star Is Born
 Christian Bale – Vice
 Ethan Hawke – First Reformed
 Rami Malek – Bohemian Rhapsody
 Viggo Mortensen – Green Book

Best Actress
 Lady Gaga – A Star Is Born
 Glenn Close – The Wife
 Toni Collette – Hereditary
 Olivia Colman – The Favourite
 Melissa McCarthy – Can You Ever Forgive Me?

Best Supporting Actor
 Mahershala Ali – Green Book
 Timothée Chalamet – Beautiful Boy
 Sam Elliott – A Star Is Born
 Richard E. Grant – Can You Ever Forgive Me?
 Michael B. Jordan – Black Panther

Best Supporting Actress
 Regina King – If Beale Street Could Talk
 Cynthia Erivo – Bad Times at the El Royale
 Nicole Kidman – Boy Erased
 Emma Stone – The Favourite
 Rachel Weisz – The Favourite

Best Adapted Screenplay
 Nicole Holofcener and Jeff Whitty – Can You Ever Forgive Me?
 Ryan Coogler and Joe Robert Cole – Black Panther
 Bradley Cooper, Will Fetters, and Eric Roth – A Star Is Born
 Barry Jenkins – If Beale Street Could Talk
 Spike Lee, David Rabinowitz, Charlie Wachtel, and Kevin Willmott – BlacKkKlansman

Best Original Screenplay
 Deborah Davis and Tony McNamara – The Favourite
 Bo Burnham – Eighth Grade
 Alfonso Cuarón – Roma
 Paul Schrader – First Reformed
 Nick Vallelonga, Peter Farrelly, and Brian Hayes Currie – Green Book

Best Ensemble
 The Favourite
 Black Panther
 If Beale Street Could Talk
 Vice
 Widows

Best Animated Feature
 Isle of Dogs
 Incredibles 2
 Mirai
 Ralph Breaks the Internet
 Spider-Man: Into the Spider-Verse
 The Grinch
 Early Man

Best Documentary Film
 Won't You Be My Neighbor?
 Free Solo
 RBG
 Science Fair
 Three Identical Strangers

Best Foreign Language Film
 Roma • Mexico Burning • South Korea
 Capernaum • Lebanon
 Cold War • Poland
 Shoplifters • JapanBest Cinematography Alfonso Cuarón – Roma
 James Laxton – If Beale Street Could Talk
 Matthew Libatique – A Star Is Born
 Robbie Ryan – The Favourite
 Linus Sandgren – First Man

Best Editing
 Tom Cross – First Man
 Jay Cassidy – A Star Is Born
 Alfonso Cuarón and Adam Gough – Roma
 Yorgos Mavropsaridis – The Favourite
 Joe Walker – Widows

Best Original Score
 Nicholas Britell – If Beale Street Could Talk
 Ludwig Göransson – Black Panther
 Justin Hurwitz – First Man
 Thom Yorke – Suspiria
 Hans Zimmer – Widows

Best Production Design
 Hannah Beachler (production design) and Jay Hart (set decoration) – Black Panther
 Eugenio Caballero (production design) and Bárbara Enríquez (set decoration) – Roma
 Fiona Crombie (production design) and Alice Felton (set decoration) – The Favourite
 Nathan Crowley (production design) and Kathy Lucas (set decoration) – First Man
 John Myhre (production design) and Gordon Sim (set decoration) – Mary Poppins Returns

Best Youth Performance
 Elsie Fisher – Eighth Grade
 Thomasin Harcourt McKenzie – Leave No Trace
 Milly Shapiro – Hereditary
 Millicent Simmonds – A Quiet Place
 Amandla Stenberg – The Hate U Give

Best Animated Voice Performance
 Bryan Cranston – Isle of Dogs
 Holly Hunter – Incredibles 2
 Shameik Moore – Spider-Man: Into the Spider-Verse
 Sarah Silverman – Ralph Breaks the Internet
 Ben Whishaw – Paddington 2

Best Motion Capture Performance
 Josh Brolin – Avengers: Infinity War
 Tye Sheridan – Ready Player One
 Phoebe Waller-Bridge – Solo: A Star Wars Story

The Joe Barber Award for Best Portrayal of Washington, D.C.
 Vice
 The Front Runner
 RBG

Multiple nominations and awards

These films had multiple nominations:

 10 nominations: The Favourite
 8 nominations: A Star Is Born
 7 nominations: If Beale Street Could Talk and Roma
 6 nominations: Black Panther
 4 nominations: First Man and Green Book
 3 nominations: Can You Ever Forgive Me?, Vice, and Widows
 2 nominations: Eighth Grade, First Reformed, Hereditary, Incredibles 2, Isle of Dogs, Ralph Breaks the Internet, RBG, and Spider-Man: Into the Spider-Verse

The following films received multiple awards:

 4 wins: Roma
 2 wins: The Favourite, If Beale Street Could Talk, Isle of Dogs, and A Star Is Born

References

External links
 The Washington D.C. Area Film Critics Association

2018
2018 film awards